Omar Sampedro Bernardo (born 5 June 1985) is a Spanish footballer who plays for Spanish club UD Llanera as a forward.

Club career
Sampedro was born in Avilés, Asturias. After finishing his graduation in neighbouring Sporting de Gijón's youth setup he made his senior debuts with the B-team in the 2004–05 season, in the Tercera División. On 24 October 2004 he played his first game as a professional, featuring the entire second half in a 3–1 home win over Córdoba CF in the Segunda División, and his first goal came on 28 November as he scored the first in a 2–1 success at Pontevedra CF.

After a loan spell with lowly Zamora CF Sampedro returned to Sporting, being promoted to La Liga in 2008 and making his debut in the competition on 26 October 2008 by coming on as a late substitute in a 3–0 away win over Deportivo de La Coruña. He finished the campaign with CD Castellón in the second level, having signed in February 2009.

After being released by the Valencians Sampedro resumed his career in the Segunda División B, representing SD Ponferradina, Pontevedra, CD Teruel, Huracán Valencia CF (two stints), CD Alcoyano and Real Avilés. Since 2015 Omar plays for UP Langreo.

References

External links
 
 Futbolme profile  
 

1985 births
Living people
People from Avilés
Spanish footballers
Footballers from Asturias
Association football forwards
La Liga players
Segunda División players
Segunda División B players
Tercera División players
Sporting de Gijón B players
Sporting de Gijón players
Zamora CF footballers
CD Castellón footballers
SD Ponferradina players
Pontevedra CF footballers
CD Teruel footballers
Huracán Valencia CF players
CD Alcoyano footballers
Real Avilés CF footballers
Marino de Luanco footballers